King's College of Engineering is an engineering college in Thanjavur, Tamil Nadu, India, founded in 2001 by  Raj Educational Trust (RET) and managed by the chief executing officer TRS. Muthukumaar. The college is affiliated to Anna University and approved by AICTE, New Delhi.

Campus 
The KCE campus spreads over 50 acres in Punalkulam, Gandarvakottai Taluk, Pudukottai District. KCE was accredited with a B Grade for a period of five years by the National Assessment and Accreditation Council (NAAC) in 2016.

Courses

UG courses 

 B.E CIVIL (Civil Engineering)
 B.E CSE (Computer Science Engineering)
 B.E ECE (Electronics and Communication Engineering)
 B.E EEE (Electrical & Electronics Engineering)
 B.E MECH (Mechanical Engineering)

PG courses 

 ME CSE (Computer Science Engineering)
 ME PED (Power Electronics and Drives)
 ME THERMAL (Thermal Engineering)
 ME VLSI (Very-Large-Scale Integration)
Fee Structure

 For Computer Science 55,000 Ruppees Per Year

Activities

References

Colleges in Tamil Nadu